Derrimut was an electoral district of the Victorian Legislative Assembly. It was located in the western suburbs of Melbourne and contained the suburbs of Albion, Derrimut as well as parts of St Albans and Sunshine.

It was first created in the redistribution undertaken before the 1985 election where it was easily won by the Labor Party's David Cunningham he held the seat until it was abolished before the 1992 election with Cunningham contesting and winning the seat of Melton.

However the seat was re-established prior to the 2002 election where it was won by Telmo Languiller whose seat of Sunshine was abolished in the same redistribution. Derrimut was again abolished in 2014, with Languiller shifting to the seat of Tarneit.

Members

Election results

See also 
 List of members of the Victorian Legislative Assembly
 Parliaments of the Australian states and territories

References

External links 
 Electorate profile: Derrimut District, Victorian Electoral Commission

Former electoral districts of Victoria (Australia)
1985 establishments in Australia
1992 disestablishments in Australia
2002 establishments in Australia
2014 disestablishments in Australia
Constituencies established in 1985
Constituencies established in 2002
Constituencies disestablished in 1992
Constituencies disestablished in 2014